The Fall of the Sparrow is a 1955 novel by the British writer Nigel Balchin. It tells the story of two men who are educated together and fight in the Second World War before one of them goes off the rails and winds up in court.

References

Bibliography
 Clive James. At the Pillars of Hercules. Pan Macmillan, 2013.

1955 British novels
Novels by Nigel Balchin
William Collins, Sons books